Despite the Tridentine Mass being supplanted by a new form of the Roman Rite Mass, some communities continued celebrating pre-conciliar rites or adopted them later. This includes priestly societies and religious institutes which use some pre-1970 edition of the Roman Missal or of a similar missal in communion with the Holy See. In the following list, all societies are considered canonically regular by the Catholic Church, so the Society of Saint Pius X (SSPX or FSSPX) is not included. Most use a pre-1970 edition of the Roman Missal, usually 1962 Missal, but some follow other Latin liturgical rites and thus celebrate not the Tridentine Mass but a form of liturgy permitted under the 1570 papal bull Quo primum.

The use of a pre-1970 Roman Missal has never been prohibited by the Catholic Church. Despite never being suppressed by the Church, it was rarely used post-Vatican II. To clarify the fact that the Extraordinary Form of the Roman Rite has never been abrogated and expand the liturgy's use, Pope Benedict XVI issued in 2007 a motu proprio titled Summorum Pontificum. In 2021, Pope Francis abrogated these more expansive permissions with his motu proprio Traditionis custodes, seeking to emphasize the celebration of the more commonly used Ordinary Form of the Mass.

Many of these communities describe themselves as traditionalist.

Priestly institutes

Exclusively traditional Mass

International
Priestly Fraternity of St. Peter (Houses in: Australia | Austria | Belgium | Canada | Colombia | Czech Republic | Finland | France | Germany | Ireland | Italy | Mexico | Netherlands | New Zealand | Nigeria | Poland | Spain | Switzerland | United Kingdom | United States)
Institute of Christ the King Sovereign Priest (Houses in: United Kingdom | France | Belgium | Germany | Switzerland | Ireland | Italy | Sweden | Spain | Gibraltar | Gabon | Mauritius | United States)
Institute of the Good Shepherd (Houses in: Brazil | Colombia | Costa Rica | France | Italy | Kenya | Poland | Uganda | United States)

Male religious

Exclusively traditional Mass

International

Sons of the Most Holy Redeemer (Houses in: New Zealand | Scotland | United States)

Australia

Benedictines – Colebrook, Tasmania

Czech Republic

Cistercians – Vyšší Brod – with Cistercian Propers

France

Benedictines – Le Barroux
Benedictines – Fontgombault
Benedictines – Monastère Saint-Benoît, Brignoles, Frejus-Toulon
Benedictines – Saint Pierre de Clairac
Benedictines – Triors
Benedictines – Wisques
Canons Regular of the Mother of God
Fraternity of the Transfiguration
Fraternity of Saint Vincent Ferrer – Dominican Rite
Missionary Society of Divine Mercy
Religious Institute of the Holy Cross of Riaumont

Germany
Institute of St. Philip Neri – Berlin

Ireland

Benedictines – Silverstream

Italy

Benedictines – Norcia
Benedictines of the Immaculate – Villatalla

Spain

Fraternitas Christi Sacerdotis et Beatae Mariae Reginae
Oasis de Jesús Sacerdote

United States

Benedictines – Clear Creek, Oklahoma
Benedictines – Sprague, Washington
Benedictines of the Strict Observance
Brothers, Slaves of the Immaculate Heart of Mary – Still River, Massachusetts
Canons Regular of the New Jerusalem – Charles Town, West Virginia
League of St. Martin of Tours – Gower, Missouri
Canons Regular of St. Thomas Aquinas – Springfield, Illinois 
Missionaries of Saint John the Baptist – Park Hills, Kentucky
 Monks of the Most Blessed Virgin Mary of Mount Carmel – Cody, Wyoming – Carmelite Rite

Not exclusively traditional Mass

International

Franciscan Friars of the Immaculate (Houses in: Argentina | Austria | Benin | Brazil | Cameroon | France | Italy | Nigeria | Philippines | Portugal | United States)
Fraternitas Beatissimae Virginis Mariae: Comunitates Iesus Sacerdos et Rex (Fraternity of the Blessed Virgin Mary: Community of Jesus Priest and King) (Houses in: Bagnoregio, Rome, and Genoa, Italy | Mailley le Château, France)
Servi Jesu et Mariae (Servants of Jesus and Mary) (Houses in: Austria | Belgium | France | Germany | Kazakhstan)

Australia

The Brisbane Oratory

Canada

 The Toronto Oratory

England

Benedictines – Belmont
Benedictines – Farnborough
Benedictines – Glastonbury
The Birmingham Oratory
Dominicans – Cambridge – Dominican Rite
Dominicans – London – Dominican Rite
The London Oratory
The Oxford Oratory
Marian Franciscans
Premonstratensians – Chelmsford – Premonstratensian Rite
The York Oratory
The Manchester Oratory

France

Fraternity of St Joseph the Guardian

Ireland

The Dublin Oratory in Formation

Italy

Opus Mariae Matris Ecclesiae – Lunigiana

United States

Apostles of Jesus Christ, Priest and Victim – Northlake, Illinois
Austrian Congregation of Canons Regular – Canonry of Saint Leopold, Glen Cove, NY
Canons Regular of Saint John Cantius – Chicago, Illinois
Congregation of the Oratory of Pharr – Pharr, Texas
The Cincinnati Oratory - Cincinnati, OH 
The Contemplatives of St. Joseph Monastic Order – San Francisco, California
Franciscans of Mary Immaculate – Warsaw, North Dakota
Holy Rosary Priory – Portland, Oregon – Dominican Rite
The Institute of Saint Joseph – Diocese of La Crosse, Wisconsin
Knights of the Holy Eucharist – Waverly, Nebraska
Premonstratensians – Silverado, California

Wales

The Cardiff Oratory

Do not offer Mass themselves

Marian Friars Minor – Bellevue, Kentucky

Militia Templi – a lay society

Female religious

Exclusively traditional Mass

International
Sisters Adorers of the Royal Heart of Jesus Christ Sovereign Priest (Houses in: England | France | Germany | Ireland | Italy | Switzerland | United States) – associated with the Institute of Christ the King

Australia

Discalced Carmelites of Jesus, Mary, and Joseph – Mathoura, New South Wales

Colombia

Esclavas Reparadoras de la Sagrada Familia (Reparative Slaves of the Holy Family) – Bogotá – associated with the Institute of the Good Shepherd

Precursoras del Reino de Dios

England

 Carmelite Monastery of the Annunciation – Birkenhead

France

Abbaye Notre-Dame de L'Annonciation (The Benedictine Nuns of Le Barroux) – Le Barroux
Chanoinesses de la Mère de Dieu (Canonesses of the Mother of God) – Azille
Dominicaines du Saint-Esprit (The Dominican Sisters of the Holy Ghost) (Houses in: Pontcalec | La Baffe | Draguignan | Nantes | Saint Cloud)
Religieuses Victimes du Sacré-Coeur de Jésus – Chavagnes-en-Paillers

Liechtenstein

Sisters of the Precious Blood – Schellenberg

Mexico

Religiosas Ecuménicas de Guadalupe – Tijuana, Baja California

New Zealand

Daughters of the Most Holy Redeemer – associated with Sons of the Most Holy Redeemer

Spain

Oasis de Jesús Sacerdote (The Oasis of Jesus Priest)

Sweden

Marias Lamm, Sankt Josefs Kloster, Lannavaara

Switzerland

Sisters of the Precious Blood – St. Pelagiberg

United States

Benedictines of Mary, Queen of Apostles – Gower, Missouri
Brigittini Servitores Sanctissimi Salvatoris Institute – Tyler, Texas
Discalced Carmelites of the Carmel of Jesus, Mary, and Joseph – Elysburg, Pennsylvania
Discalced Carmelites of the Carmel of Jesus, Mary, and Joseph – Fairfield, Pennsylvania
Discalced Carmelites of the Carmel of Jesus, Mary, and Joseph – Valparaiso, Nebraska
Discalced Carmelite Nuns of the Monastery of the Little Flower of Jesus – Buffalo, New York
Filiae Laboris Mariae (Daughters of Mary's Labor) – Minneapolis, Minnesota
Missionary Sisters of Saint Francis of Assisi – Diocese of Youngstown, Ohio
Poor Clare Nuns of Annunciation Monastery – Minooka, Illinois
Servants of the Children of Light – Mandan, North Dakota
Sisters, Slaves of the Immaculate Heart of Mary at the Saint Benedict Center – Still River, Massachusetts

Not exclusively traditional Mass

International

Franciscan Sisters of the Immaculate (Missions in: Philippines | Kazakhstan | Holy Land | United States | Brazil | Argentina | Benin | Nigeria | Italy | United Kingdom | Poland | Portugal)
Contemplative Sisters of the Immaculate (Houses in: Imperia and Perugia, Italy | Cebu, Philippines)
Trinitarians of Mary (Houses in: San Diego and West Covina, California | Lowell, Michigan | Guadalajara and Tecate, Mexico)

England

Benedictines – Herefordshire

France

Benedictines – Rosans

Italy

Fraternitas Beatissimae Virginis Mariae: Comunitas Agnus Dei (Fraternity of the Blessed Virgin Mary: Community of the Lamb of God) – (Houses in: Bagnoregio | Gavi)

United States

Children of Mary – Ohio (Houses in: Cincinnati | Newark)
The Contemplatives of St. Joseph – San Francisco, California
Carmelite Daughters of Elias 
Discalced Carmelites of the Carmelite Monastery of the Infant of Prague – Traverse City, Michigan
Discalced Carmelite Nuns of the Carmel of the Holy Spirit – Littleton, Colorado
Discalced Carmelite Nuns of the Carmel of Jesus, Mary, and Joseph – Kensington, California
Daughters of Mary, Mother of Israel's Hope – Tulsa, Oklahoma
Dominican Nuns of the Monastery of St. Jude – Marbury, Alabama – Dominican Rite and Tridentine Mass
Franciscan Daughters of Mary – Covington, Kentucky
Little Workers of the Sacred Hearts (Houses in: Connecticut | Philadelphia, PA | Riverdale, MD | Washington, DC)
Marian Sisters of Santa Rosa – Santa Rosa, California
Norbertine Canonesses – Tehachapi, California – Premonstratensian Rite
Poor Sisters of St. Clare at Our Lady of the Angels Monastery – Fort Wayne, Indiana
Sisters of Mary, Mother of the Church – Spokane, Washington

Others
Personal Apostolic Administration of Saint John Mary Vianney
Our Lady of the Enclosed Garden Hermitage – Warfhuizen

External links
Worldwide Latin Mass directory

References

Communities
Traditionalist Catholicism
Christian religious orders established in the 20th century